French football club SC Bastia's 2000–01 season. Finished 8th place in league. Top scorer of the season, including 17 goals in 16 league matches have been Frédéric Née. Was eliminated to Coupe de France end of 16, the Coupe de la Ligue was able to be among the final 16 teams.

Transfers

In 
Summer
 Demetrius Ferreira from Nancy
 Michael Essien from Liberty Professionals
 David Faderne from Ajaccio
 Sébastien Piocelle from Nantes

Winter
 Cyril Domoraud from Inter

Out 
Summer
 Franck Jurietti to AS Monaco
 Zoumana Camara to Marseille
 Dan Petersen to Bastia B

Winter
 David Mazzoncini to free

Squad

French Division 1

League table

Results summary

Results by round

Matches

Coupe de France

Coupe de la Ligue

Statistics

Top scorers

League assists

Notes

References 

SC Bastia seasons
Bastia